Celia Barker Lottridge (born 1936) is a Canadian children's writer.

Lottridge was born in Iowa City, Iowa. She received a BA in modern European history from Stanford University, a MLS from Columbia University and a BEd from the University of Toronto. Lottridge worked as a librarian in San Diego, New York City and Rhode Island. She was a teacher and librarian for the Toronto School Board. From 1977 to 1990, she was a book buyer for a children's book store in Toronto.

Books
 Gerasim and the Lion, illustrated by Joanne Page (Erin, ON: Bright Star Bookstores, 1979)
 The Juggler (Richmond Hill, ON: North Winds Press, 1985), Lottridge and Ariadna Ochrymovych
 Prairie Dogs (Toronto: Grolier, 1985), Lottridge and Susan Horner; bound with Bighorn Sheep by Bill Ivy; reprinted 1999, Grolier
 Mice (Grolier, 1986), Lottridge and Horner
 One Watermelon Seed), illus. Karen Patkau (Toronto: Stoddart Books, 1986), picture book
 The Name of the Tree: a Bantu Tale, illus. Ian Wallace, (Groundwood Books, 1989), reteller; U.S. edition 1990, Margaret K. McElderry Books
 Ten Small Tales, illus. Joanne Fitzgerald (McElderry, 1990), reteller; reprinted 2005, Groundwood
 The American Children's Treasury (Key Porter Books, 1991), editor
 Ticket to Curlew, illus. Wendy Wolsak-Frith (Groundwood, 1992), novel; published 1996 as Ticket to Canada, Silver Burdett; received the Geoffrey Bilson Award and the Canadian Library Association Book of the Year for Children Award
 Something Might Be Hiding, illus. Paul Zwolak, (Groundwood, 1994), picture book
 Music for the Tsar of the Sea: a Russian Wonder Tale, illus. Harvey Chan (Groundwood, 1995), reteller
 The Wind Wagon, illus. Daniel Clifford (Silver Burdett Press, 1995), novel
 Letters to the Wind: Classic Stories and Poems for Children (Key Porter, 1995), compiler; published 2001 as American Stories and Poems for Children
 Wings to Fly, illus. Mary Jane Gerber (Groundwood, 1997), novel
 Bounce Me, Tickle Me, Hug Me: Lap Rhymes and Play Rhymes from around the World, compiled by Sandra Carpenter-Davis (Toronto: Parent-Child Mother Goose Program, 1997), adaptor
 The Little Rooster and the Diamond Button: a Hungarian Folktale, illus. Joanne Fitzgerald (Groundwood, 2001), reteller; received Mr. Christie's Book Award
 Berta, a Remarkable Dog, illus. Elsa Myotte (Groundwood, 2002), novel
 Stories from the Life of Jesus: Stories from the Bible, illus. Linda Wolfsgruber (Groundwood, 2004), reteller
 Stories from Adam to Ezekiel; Retold from the Bible, illus. Gary Clement (Groundwood, 2004), reteller

References

Sources
Ten Small Tales   
Ten Small Tales: Stories from Around the World   
Home is Beyond the Mountains
THE NAME OF THE TREE: A Bantu Folktale

External links

 Celia Barker Lottridge at Groundwood Books (archived 2011-09-30)
 Celia Barker Lottridge at The Writers' Union of Canada (archived 2012-02-24)
 Celia Barker Lottridge at the Canadian Society of Children's Authors, Illustrators, and Performers (archived 2009-01-03)
 

1936 births
Living people
20th-century Canadian novelists
Canadian children's writers
Canadian storytellers
Women storytellers
Canadian women novelists
Canadian women children's writers
20th-century Canadian women writers
Date of birth missing (living people)
Columbia University School of Library Service alumni